Bob Bryan and Mike Bryan were the defending champions and won in the final 7–5, 6–3 against Jürgen Melzer and Alexander Popp.

Seeds

  Bob Bryan /  Mike Bryan (champions)
  Julian Knowle /  Michael Kohlmann (first round)
  Justin Gimelstob /  Michaël Llodra (first round)
  Ben Ellwood /  Chris Haggard (first round)

Draw

External links
 2002 Miller Lite Hall of Fame Championships Doubles Draw

2002 Hall of Fame Tennis Championships